The 1967 Bandy World Championship was the fifth Bandy World Championship and was contested between four men's bandy playing nations. The championship was played in Finland from 14–19 February 1967. The Soviet Union became champions.

Group A

Premier tour
 14 February
 Soviet Union – Norway 5–0
 Sweden – Finland 1–1
 16 February
 Sweden – Norway 2–1
 Soviet Union – Finland 1–1
 18 February
 Finland – Norway 5–3
 19 February
 Soviet Union – Sweden 2–2

References

1967
World Championships
Bandy World Championships
International bandy competitions hosted by Finland
Bandy World Championships